This list of dinosaur species on display lists which venue (museum or public or private location) exhibits (or has exhibited) which dinosaur species. Exhibits include skeletons (partial and complete, mounted and unmounted, originals and casts) and reconstructions.

Asia

Australia

Europe

North America

References 

Display